Panabá is a town and the municipal seat of the Panabá Municipality, Yucatán in Mexico.

References

Populated places in Yucatán